Juniperus semiglobosa, the Himalayan pencil juniper, is a species of juniper native to the mountains of Central Asia, in northeastern Afghanistan, westernmost China (Xinjiang), northern Pakistan, southeastern Kazakhstan, Kyrgyzstan, western Nepal, northern Republic of India, Tajikistan, and Uzbekistan.

Description
It has flaky bark.

The cones are flattened globose (from which the name semiglobosa) to bi-lobed or triangular, berry-like, 4–6 mm long and 4–8 mm across, blue-black, and contain two or three seeds; they are mature in about 18 months. The pollen cones are 3–5 mm long, and shed their pollen in spring. It is usually dioecious (male and female cones on separate plants), but occasionally monoecious (male and female cones on the same plant).

Varieties
A variety Juniperus semiglobosa var. talassica has been described from Kyrgyzstan as having sweeter cone pulp, but does not differ from the type in genetics or leaf chemistry, and is not usually regarded as distinct.

References

External links 
 Conifers Around the World: Juniperus semiglobosa - Tien Shan Foetid Juniper.

semiglobosa
Flora of Central Asia
Flora of Nepal
Flora of Kyrgyzstan
Flora of Pakistan
Flora of West Himalaya
Flora of Xinjiang
Taxa named by Eduard August von Regel
Taxonomy articles created by Polbot